Wassaw Island is one of the Sea Islands. It is located on the Atlantic Ocean off the coast of the U.S. state of Georgia and is within the borders of Chatham County. The land mass is 76 percent salt marshes and 24 percent beaches, dunes, and maritime forest. The refuge is a part of the Savannah Coastal Refuges Complex.

The United States government owns most of the island.  Loggerhead sea turtles nest on the beaches in late spring and early summer, and turtlers can camp at the turtlers' cabin at the Federal Dock (refuge headquarters office), and then go to the beach at night to observe the turtles.  Aside from this, the Federal Dock is usually only used when natural disasters occur on the island and assistance is necessary.

The island is accessible only by chartered or private boat.  Most visitors arriving by private boat anchor their boats to the north or south beaches or in Wassaw Creek, near the boat dock for the refuge headquarters office.  The public is encouraged to use twenty miles (32 km) of dirt trails for hiking or bicycling.

History
Human activity and impact on Wassaw has been minimal. Native Americans apparently used the island for hunting fish, fowl, reptiles, and shellfish. Indian artifacts dating to A.D. 500-600 have been found on the island.

For most of the 19th century the island was occupied by Anthony Odingsell, an African American planter, who inherited Little Wassaw Island from his former master and probable father, Charles Odingsell. Anthony Odingsell was the wealthiest free person of color in Georgia for many years.

During the Civil War the island was occupied first by Confederate troops and then Union troops. Then in 1866, George Parsons, a wealthy businessman, purchased the island with the intent of making it a holiday retreat for family and friends.

In 1898, during the Spanish–American War, a fort was built into the dunes on the north end of the island as part of the Endicott system of coastal forts. Over time, high tides, wind, and rain have eroded away the dunes, and the fort made of oyster tabby, poured concrete, and North Georgia granite continues to deteriorate from its already dilapidated condition.

In 1969, the Parsons family, in an effort to keep the island from being developed, conveyed the island to the Nature Conservancy of Georgia. Today, the island is a national wildlife refuge managed by the U.S. Fish and Wildlife Service. The Caretta Research Project, which focuses on learning more about the endangered loggerhead sea turtles, is conducted on the island by volunteers.

Wassaw National Wildlife Refuge

The refuge is bordered by the Wilmington River and Wassaw Sound to the north and the Vernon River and Ossabaw Sound to the south and encompasses the barrier island, two smaller islands known collectively as Little Wassaw Island, and a few hammocks.

Fishing, collecting shells and wildlife, biking, and camping are illegal on the beach of the island.

Fort Morgan
At the northern end of the Wassaw Beach, facing the ocean, are the ruins of Fort Morgan from the Spanish–American War, built in 1898 by Second Lieutenant Henry Sims Morgan of the U.S. Army Corps of Engineers.  The fort is made from cement and granite gravel, with small clam shells embedded in the walls. The ruins are slowly deteriorating as tidal forces and shifting sands have caused sections to crumble under their own weight. The tidal action of the beach leaves much of the ruins exposed some years and other years much of it appears to have been buried under several feet of sand.

Sometimes the corroded remains of the bolts which held the two 4.7-inch rapid fire cannon mounts are clearly visible in their circular pattern located on either side of the main bunker. These two cannons were intended to defend Savannah against a possible approach by the Spanish via the Wilmington River. The fort was the largest single fortification built specifically for the Spanish–American War and was constructed by civilians under the guidance of the US Army Corps of Engineers.

As the ruins are a prominent feature easily visible from other coastal islands to the north, the top of the bunker has an official USGS Survey marker embedded in the concrete roof.

Since Hurricane Irma in 2017 the surrounding beach has eroded, leaving the structure approximately 40 yards off of the beach at low tide.

Airplane crash
According to the NTSB report, At 9:30 on July 4, 1980 a mosquito control Beach C18S tail number N35MS twin-engine airplane on a flight from Johns Island, South Carolina with a destination of Kings Bay, Georgia, crashed on the south end of the island killing both pilot and copilot. The pilot was 50 years old and had over 8,000 hours flight time. Both pilots were incapacitated at the time of the uncontrolled descent.

NTSB remarks: Aircraft observed in shallow descent til impact. DIBROM 14 on board that when atomized produces blinding fumes.

Wildlife

Mammals and reptiles
 White-tail deer
 Wild boar
 Alligator
 Loggerhead sea turtle
 Armadillo

Birds
 Bald eagle
 Egrets
 Herons
 Peregrine falcon
 Piping plover
 Wood stork
 Migratory birds
 Various shore birds

References

External links
 

Protected areas of Chatham County, Georgia
Barrier islands of Georgia (U.S. state)
National Wildlife Refuges in Georgia (U.S. state)
Protected areas established in 1969
Georgia (U.S. state) Sea Islands
Islands of Chatham County, Georgia
Islands of Georgia (U.S. state)
Wetlands of Georgia (U.S. state)
1969 establishments in Georgia (U.S. state)
National Natural Landmarks in Georgia (U.S. state)